The 1999 Oran Park V8 Supercar round was the eleventh round of the 1999 Shell Championship Series. It was held on the weekend of 3 to 5 September at Oran Park Raceway in Sydney, New South Wales.

Race results

Qualifying

Top 50%

Bottom 50%

Privateers Race

Race 1

References

External links 

Oran Park